Bordeaux Aéronautique (BA) was a French aeronautic company founded  on 17 March 1939, by Marcel Bloch, André Curvale, Henri Deplante and Claude de Cambronne.

History 
Facing plane production increase, the SAAMB buys in September 1939, in Talence, near Bordeaux, industrial buildings in a workshop next to the Château de Brama (also called Castle of Edward, the Black Prince) which is retroceded to Bordeaux-Aéronautique. France produces at that time the most important rearmament.

The company was supposed to produce for the Vichy French Air Force, front fuselages of Bloch MB.175 and Bloch MB.1020 aircraft, but after the Battle of Dunkirk, production stopped at the end of 1940, during the German military administration when Marcel Bloch is arrested on 6 October 1940. During his detention at Thiers, theCommissariat général aux questions juives sends to the regional directions of the economic epuration service of Marseilles and Limoges the order to investigate the Bloch companies.

The Comité d'organisation de l'aéronautique directed by Joseph Roos achieves to slow down all processes of Aryanisation, but in 1942, the German authorities of the Militärbefehlshaber in Frankreich (MBF) names a short-term administrator of the Bloch company in Saint-Cloud, Jean de Broë. On 20 December 1940, Marcel Bloch delegates authority to Henri Carol.

The Vichy French Air Force uses Bloch MB.150 family fighter aircraft and Bloch MB.170 family bomber aircraft, equipping all fighter and bomber units in the unoccupied zone under the Franco-German Agreements. Also being limited to three groups stationed in North Africa. In November, 173 MB.152/155 are gathered at Guyancourt, Orange-Caritat and Châteauroux, for use in training fighter pilots for the Luftwaffe.

Chuck Yeager, first pilot confirmed to have exceeded the Sound barrier in level flight (played by Sam Shepard in The Right Stuff), flew P-51 Mustangs in combat with the 363d Fighter Squadron, named Glamorous Glen, and survived after he was shot down over Nérac, between Bordeaux and Toulouse, in his first aircraft (P-51B-5-NA s/n 43-6763) on March 5, 1944 during his eighth mission, by Focke-Wulf Fw 190 from the Ergänzungs-Jagdgruppe West, based in Cazaux and directed by Herbert Wehnelt, 1971-1974 commander of the  German Air Force Command.

After leaving Pau on 20 August 1944, the Germans leave Bordeaux on 28 August. SNCASO comes back to Bordeaux–Mérignac Airport to work for the Allies and after his return from Buchenwald, in April 1945, Marcel Dassault (née Bloch) calls back the group of Talence to relaunch his aircraft company. In June 1945 Marcel Dassault reorganizes the BA 30 project<ref>Guerres mondiales et con flits contemporains : Des hommes d'église dans la grande guerre, Numéros 187 à 188, 1996, p. 86</ref> and in July 1946, two prototypes are ordered: the Sud-Ouest Bretagne and the Dassault MD 315 Flamant with the SNECMA-Argus S12 and V12 that equipped the Fw 189. In 1947, Jacques Chaban-Delmas, former general of the French Résistance close to the aircraft manufacturer, becomes Mayor (Maire) of Bordeaux.

External links
 Marcel Dassault – Dassault Aviation site

 See also 

 Groupe Dassault
 Dassault Aviation
 German military administration in occupied France during World War II
 Battle of the Atlantic

 Bibliography 
 Marcel Dassault, Le Talisman (autobiographie), éd. J'ai Lu, 1970 et éd. Jours de France, 1973
 Jean-Yves Lorant, Le Focke-Wulf 190, Paris, avec Jean-Bernard Frappé, Editions Larivière, coll. « Docavia », 1981, 408 p.
 Guy Audrain, Le Bureau d’études de Bordeaux, 1982
 Pierre Assouline, Monsieur Dassault, Balland, 1983, 
 Herrick Chapman, State Capitalism and Working-Class Radicalism in the French Aircraft Industry. Berkeley: University of California Press, 1991
 Claude d'Abzac-Epezy, L'Armée de l'air des années noires : Vichy 1940-1944, avec Général Maurice Schmitt, 1998
 Claude Carlier, Marcel Dassault la légende d'un siècle, Perrin, 2002
 Patrick Facon, La guerre aérienne, 1933-1945, 2003
 Guy Vadepied (avec la collaboration de Pierre Péan), Marcel Dassault ou les ailes du pouvoir, éd. Fayard, 2003
 Vincent Giraudier, Les bastilles de vichy, répression politique et internement administratif, Editions Taillandier, 2009 
 Claude Carlier, Dassault, de Marcel à Serge, Cent ans d'une étonnante aventure humaine, industrielle et politique, Perrin, 2017
 Alain Juppé, Dictionnaire amoureux de Bordeaux, Plon, 2018
 Malcolm Abbott, Jill Bamforth, The Early Development of the Aviation Industry: Entrepreneurs of the Sky'', Taylor & Francis, 2019

References

Notes

Aircraft manufacturers of France
Dassault Group
Defence companies of France
Defunct aircraft manufacturers of France
French companies established in 1939
Companies based in Bordeaux
Marcel Dassault